Acapnolymma sulcaticeps is a species of beetle in the family Cerambycidae, and the only species in the genus Acapnolymma. It was described by Pic in 1923.

References

Beetles described in 1923
Lepturinae